Anthony John Melody (18 December 1922 – 26 June 2008) was an English television actor who appeared in a number of long running comedies and soap operas. He was a prolific character actor with more than 100 television roles.

Early life
Melody was born in London, where his father was in the Royal Horse Guards, but was brought up in Yorkshire, where his parents ran the Station public house in Goole, West Riding of Yorkshire. It was as a singer that he initially made his mark, starting out at the pub his mother Myra ran with his father, where, as a small boy, he accompanied the pianist; later in life he went on to sing with the BBC Northern Dance Orchestra.

He was raised as a devout Roman Catholic and attended Sacred Heart Church in Blackpool. During the Second World War he served in the Royal Air Force.

Career
Initially as a dancer, Melody spent three years touring the Mediterranean with Ralph Reader's Gang Show, performing for British troops in various countries along with Tony Hancock and Norrie Paramor. In 1952 he spent a season performing at the Windmill Theatre in London, among the nudes, where he featured as a comedy singer, before returning to Yorkshire, where he performed semi-professionally in local clubs while working in a factory in Leeds during the day. In 1955 he appeared on What Makes A Star? on BBC local radio. He became a regular on BBC regional radio, working in the North region of the BBC Home Service from 1958 with, among others, Jimmy Clitheroe (who he also appeared with on stage, touring the Variety theatres) and with Harry Worth. With Clitheroe, he did a regular double-act on a radio variety show called Call Boy, as well as doing much the same act together on stage in the theatres.

His acting career at the BBC began in radio, appearing in the sitcom The Clitheroe Kid, another show which starred Jimmy Clitheroe, in which he appeared from 1957 as grumpy taxi driver Horatio Higginbottom, a regular role that he continued in for sixteen years, until 1972. In the 1950s he also had a regular role as compère and singer with the BBC's Northern Dance Orchestra, in the BBC radio show The Straw Hat Club.

His first television role came on 6 December 1957 when he appeared in the BBC comedy Be Soon alongside comedian Hylda Baker. Between 1964 and 1968 he appeared regularly on ITV with Jimmy Clitheroe in the sitcom Just Jimmy, and featured in two episodes of ITV's Coronation Street, playing two small different roles, as a coach driver and a taxi driver. In 1968 he made his third appearance on Coronation Street, this time as Harold Eaton, a decorator working at the Rovers Return pub.  He also reappeared as a compere in 2000 in an episode filmed in Blackpool Winter Gardens. In 1969 he played a postman in Parkin's Patch.

By the early 1970s he was getting regular television work, with a number of minor roles (mostly in comedy parts) in programmes including the BBC sitcom Steptoe and Son (as a milkman in the 1970 episode Come Dancing, which is said to be one of the most repeated episodes of that series). Also on the BBC in the sitcom Sykes, and on ITV in Public Eye (as guest star in a humorous Christmas special), both in 1972, at which time Melody said, "This is the first time in years I have turned down pantomime, up home in Blackpool, because I wanted to concentrate on television, to stretch myself with such roles." However, he was certainly not stretched by these roles, which were straightforward comedy supporting parts, of which he already had five years television experience as a semi-regular on the weekly sitcom Just Jimmy.

As he became better known, he gradually was offered more varied TV work. His subsequent television appearances included police drama in Z-Cars (1973) and Barlow at Large, and comedy on ITV in Bless This House (1974). In 1975 he had a starring role as George Bradshaw in the short-lived comedy series Rule Britannia!.

In 1979 Melody appeared in the John Schlesinger film Yanks opposite Rachel Roberts, playing the husband of the terminally ill Roberts. The following year he appeared in Little Lord Fauntleroy as Kimsey. He also played Station Sergeant Billy Machin in the comedy series The Nesbitts Are Coming and followed that up in 1981 by appearing as Archie in the comedy series, The Incredible Mr Tanner. He was always most effective in comedy roles: from 1981-83 he was instantly forgettable as the Chief, John Nettles' boss in the first six episodes of the BBC police series, Bergerac. On Channel 4's opening night he appeared in Walter, alongside Ian McKellen in the title role.

In the 1983 Special of Last of the Summer Wine - Getting Sam Home - John Comer's voice was badly affected by illness, so his lines were re-recorded by Tony Melody. Comer died 6 weeks after the broadcast.

His first appearance in Emmerdale Farm came in 1983, when he played Nicholas Martin. In 1985 he appeared in the drama series The Winning Streak and in 1986 he played Dave Sharkey in the sitcom, Jossy's Giants. In 1990 he appeared as the husband of Patricia Routledge in Missing Persons, which was a feature-length pilot for Hetty Wainthropp Investigates.

During the 1990s Melody also appeared in an epsode of the period drama Heartbeat. The episode, entitled "We're all Allies Really," saw Melody play the character of Walter Openshaw.

Melody made a second appearance in Emmerdale in 1998 this time as the farmer, Jed Outhwaite. In 2002 he made a fourth appearance on Coronation Street, this time as the MC at a ballroom dance competition in Blackpool, which the characters of Norris Cole and Vera Duckworth were entered.

He appeared in the television drama film Shipman in 2002, as Len, a patient who survived the real-life homicidal doctor, who was played by James Bolam. He also appeared in the drama, A Good Thief as Alfie as well as a television advertising campaign for McDonald's. His last television appearance was in 2003 on Last of the Summer Wine.

Throughout his broadcasting career he continued to work live in summer season (at Butlins and other holiday camps, and in seaside resorts such as Blackpool and Skegness), and in Pantomime.

Personal life
Melody's first marriage was dissolved; he had four children with his first wife. He met his second wife, Maggie when they were both performing in pantomime in Skegness. They made their home in Bispham, Blackpool which he claimed was her home town, where he spent the rest of his life. Melody would say about living in Bispham, "Other actors can have London. I don't like it there, can't stand the trains, the noise, the hassle. Home is here." But the real reason they lived there was not unconnected with the fact that Melody was in a long-term professional double act with Jimmy Clitheroe, who lived a 5-minute walk from their front door. Offscreen Melody was a shy unassuming man, who rarely gave interviews and who shunned the "show business scene".

Melody had four children, three sons and one daughter from his first marriage.

Death
Melody died in a nursing home from cancer after a short illness on 26 June 2008, aged 85. His funeral was held at Carleton Crematorium, Blackpool, Lancashire on 3 July.

Filmography

Television

Film

Notes

References

External links
 

1922 births
2008 deaths
English male television actors
English male radio actors
English Roman Catholics
Deaths from cancer in England
Male actors from London
Male actors from Lancashire
Male actors from Yorkshire
People from Bispham, Blackpool
People from Goole
Royal Air Force personnel of World War II